From Croydon to Cuba: An Anthology is a three disc box set by the British singer and songwriter Kirsty MacColl, released by Virgin in 2005. It reached No. 98 on the UK Albums Chart.

Reception

Upon release, Dave Thompson of AllMusic described the set as a "marvel" and one which leaves listeners "wondering precisely how MacColl's genius passed so many people by". John Murphy of musicOMH considered it a "long overdue retrospective" and summarised: "Although there are some omissions, this anthology is still a compulsory purchase for anyone who wants to know more about one of the more cruelly over-looked figures of British music."

Robert Sandall of The Telegraph commented: "This box set offers a comprehensive reminder of just how characterful a talent departed the planet when Kirsty MacColl [died] in 2000. Not all of the 65 tracks here are classics - like most box sets, this contains a sprinkling of rare or unreleased what-nots which collectors love but others skip. But the story they tell is riveting."

Track listing
Adapted from the box set liner notes.

Disc one

Disc two

Disc three

Production
Adapted from the box set liner notes.

Disc one
Liam Sternberg – producer (1)
Barry "Bazza" Farmer – producer (3-7, 9)
Brian Hodgson – producer (8)
Dave Jordan – producer (10-14)
Kirsty MacColl – producer (15, 17)
Gavin Povey – producer (15)
Steve Lillywhite – producer (16, 18-22)
Disc two
Steve Lillywhite – producer (1-7, 10, 13-20)
Kirsty MacColl – producer (8, 9, 11, 12)
Colin Stuart – producer (8, 9, 11, 12)
Howard Gray – additional production (15)

Disc three
Steve Lillywhite – producer (1)
Gregg Jackman – additional production (1)
Victor Van Vugt – producer (2-5, 7)
Kirsty MacColl – producer (2-9, 11, 14-19)
Mark E. Nevin – producer (2-6)
Boz Boorer – producer (8, 9, 11)
Andy Roberts – producer (10)
John Reynolds – producer (12)
Dónal Lunny – producer (13)
Dave Ruffy – producer (15-18)
Pete Glenister – producer (15-18, 21)
James Knight – producer (19)
Philip Chevron – producer (20)
Nick Robbins – producer (20)

Charts

Notes

References

2005 compilation albums
Kirsty MacColl albums